Authomaema is a genus of moths belonging to the subfamily Tortricinae of the family Tortricidae.

Species
Authomaema diemeniana (Zeller, 1877)
Authomaema pentacosma (Lower, 1900)
Authomaema rusticata Meyrick, 1922

See also
List of Tortricidae genera

References

 , 1916, Trans. R. S. Austral. 40: 507.

External links
tortricidae.com

Archipini
Tortricidae genera